The China Banking Regulatory Commission (CBRC) was an agency of the People's Republic of China (PRC) authorised by the State Council to regulate the banking sector of the PRC except the territories of Hong Kong and Macau, both of which are special administrative regions.

History 
In response to their swelling debt loads, undercapitalization and non-transparent business practices, the government of China recapitalized the banks and set up the CBRC as the country's independent banking regulator in 2003. Liu Mingkang was appointed its first chairman and served until 2011, when he was replaced by Shang Fulin. In 2017, Shang was replaced by Guo Shuqing as the new chairman. 

Active in developing policies to promote financial inclusion, the Bank is a member of the Alliance for Financial Inclusion.

In April 2018, the China Banking Regulatory Commission was merged with the China Insurance Regulatory Commission to form the China Banking and Insurance Regulatory Commission.

See also 
 China Securities Journal

References

External links 
 

2003 establishments in China
Banking in China
Financial regulatory authorities of China
Government agencies established in 2003
Government agencies of China
State Council of the People's Republic of China
2018 disestablishments in China